Many Armenian merchants from Amsterdam went to Southeast Asia in the 19th century to trade, and to set up factories and plantations. Armenian merchants settled in parts of Java, then part of the Dutch East Indies, as did Armenians moving east from the Persian Empire, establishing a community of Armenians in Java.

In 1808, with a growing community, George Manook (Gevork Manuch Merchell) along with others, securing 25,000 Guilders from the Dutch Government, established schools and a church. In 1852 Haileian Miabanse Thioen in Batavia, helped to open orphanages and schools for Armenian children. The community also built a small chapel in Batavia and founded a school in 1855.

In 1865, names like Galistan, Lazar, Joseph Amir, Manook, Arakiel Navaran, and Stefan Arathoon appeared in commercial almanacs. In the sugar industry, Manook Jordan owned the Mlongo factory, and P. Andreas owned the Trangkil factory.

On 6 January 1880, the Armenian community was formally recognised as an incorporated society by the Dutch government. Within a short time Armenians extended also to Singapore where they were involved in the opium trade, which was under British control, while some Armenian missionaries went on to the Philippines.

Most of the original Armenian community, however, has left Indonesia after the independence, however, there was an estimated number of less than a hundred people that still residing there, including in Java. This can be seen through few families that held family names such as Manook and Galistan.

Notable Armenians
George Manook, was among the richest figures in Dutch East India, and often lent the Dutch government funds. He left behind a large fortune of five million guilders when he died.

The Sarkies Brothers were known for founding a chain of luxury hotels throughout Southeast Asia.

Bejamin Galstaun

See also
Armenian diaspora
Armenians in Surabaya
Armenia-indonesia relations

References

Further reading
 G.Paulus, The Armenian Community in the Netherlands India

 
Indonesia
Armenian diaspora in Asia
Ethnic groups in Indonesia